Galich is a town in Kostroma Oblast, Russia, located on the southern bank of Lake Galichskoye. As of the 2021 Census, its population was 12,856.

History
It was first chronicled in 1234 as Grad Mersky (lit. the town of the Merya). It gradually developed into one of the greatest salt-mining centers of Eastern Europe, eclipsing the southern town of Halych, from which it takes its name. In the 13th century, Galich was ruled by a younger brother of Alexander Nevsky and remained in his line until 1363, when the Muscovites seized the principality and ousted the ruling family to Novgorod.

The 15th and 16th centuries are justly considered the golden age of Galich. At that time it controlled most of the Russian trade in salt and furs. Dmitry Shemyaka and other local princes pressed their claims to the Muscovite crown, and three of them actually took possession of the Kremlin in the course of the Great Feudal War.

The early medieval earthen ramparts were further fortified in the early 15th and 16th centuries and have since been known as Shemyaka Hills. The Poles burnt it to the ground in 1612, Peter the Great had a wooden kremlin demolished, and it further declined with the transfer of Russian foreign trade from Arkhangelsk to St. Petersburg.

Town status was granted to Galich in 1778.

Administrative and municipal status
Within the framework of administrative divisions, Galich serves as the administrative center of Galichsky District, even though it is not a part of it. As an administrative division, it is incorporated separately as the town of oblast significance of Galich—an administrative unit with the status equal to that of the districts. As a municipal division, the town of oblast significance of Galich is incorporated as Galich Urban Okrug.

Economy

The Galich Mobile Crane Plant manufactures some 20% of Russia's entire mobile crane production.

Town's industries also manufacture steel barrels, shoes, and clothing. There is a timber mill in town as well.

The town is also a minor railroad node of the Trans-Siberian Railway.

Culture

Historic monuments of Galich include various buildings from the imperial period of Russian history. Particularly noteworthy is the Paisiev Monastery, founded in the early 14th century and featuring a 16th-century five-domed cathedral and a three-domed church from 1642.

Since 2004, Galich hosts the annual short film festival "Russia's Family" (Semya Rossii), whose stated goals are "to aid spiritual and moral healing of Russian society and to promote traditional family values".

References

Notes

Sources

External links

Official website of Galich 
Unofficial website of Galich 
Another unofficial website of Galich 
Galich directory of organizations 

Cities and towns in Kostroma Oblast
Galich Urban Okrug
 
Galichsky Uyezd